Andrew M. Rosenfield is an entrepreneur, philanthropist, and the president of Guggenheim Partners, which he joined in 2004 as Managing Partner. He is a Professor (a Senior Lecturer) at the University of Chicago Law School, where he has taught since 1986. He is one of America’s foremost scholars on antitrust law.

Early career and education
Rosenfield was educated at Kenyon College, Harvard University and The University of Chicago. He received his J.D. degree from The University of Chicago Law School in 1978, where he was elected to the Order of the Coif and graduated with honors. Rosenfield began his business career while still a student at the University of Chicago when in 1977, he co-founded Lexecon Inc. with Richard Posner and William Landes. He led that firm as its chief executive officer for more than 20 years until its sale in 2000.

In 1998, Rosenfield founded UNext Inc., an early online education business, and served as its chief executive officer until it was acquired by early investor Knowledge Universe. UNext partnered with Columbia University, The London School of Economics, Carnegie-Mellon University, Stanford University and The University of Chicago.

From 2006 through 2018 Rosenfield also was chief executive officer of TGG Group, which he co-founded with Gary Becker, Daniel Kahneman and Steve Levitt.

Titles and affiliations 
Rosenfield is a member of the board of trustees of The University of Chicago, vice-chairman of the board of trustees of the Art Institute of Chicago, and a past member of the board of The Lyric Opera of Chicago.

Philanthropic donations
In 2011, Rosenfield and his wife, Betsy, donated $25 million to the Becker Friedman Institute for Research in Economics at the University of Chicago; a gift honoring his mentors.

All of Rosenfield’s other philanthropic donations are assumed to have been made anonymously.

References

External links
 Rosenfield's bio at TGG Group

Living people
Kenyon College alumni
Harvard University alumni
University of Chicago Law School alumni
University of Chicago Law School faculty
American chief executives
Year of birth missing (living people)